Trifon or Trifón is a given name derived from Greek  Τρύφων, Tryphon literally meaning "one who lives in luxury". An archaic transliteration from Greek is Trufon. It is used by Russians and other peoples of  East Orthodox denomination.

In Finnic languages, a variant is Triihpo, appeared as a result of an f → hp change. Another variant of the word is Ruippo, a surname which was used in Southern Karelia and Eastern Savo before World War II. Notable people with the name include:

Given name
 Metropolitan Trifon (1861–1934), hierarch of the Russian Orthodox Church
 Trifon Datsinski (born 1953), Bulgarian equestrian
 Trifón Gómez (1889–1955), Spanish politician
 Trifon Ivanov (1965–2016), Bulgarian football player
 Trifon Korobeynikov (16th-century), Moscow merchant and traveller
 Trifon Shevaldin (1888–1954), Soviet military officer

See also
 
Tryphon (disambiguation)
Saint Tryphon (disambiguation)
Trifon Zarezan, Bulgarian custom

References

Bulgarian masculine given names
Greek masculine given names
Russian masculine given names